The 2017–18 Macedonian First League was the 26th season of the Macedonian First Football League, the highest football league of Macedonia. The fixtures were announced on 25 July 2017.  It began on 12 August 2017 and ended on 20 May 2018. Each team will play the other sides four times on home-away basis, for a total of 36 matches. Vardar are the defending champions, having won their tenth title in 2016–17.

Promotion and relegation

Participating teams

Personnel and kits

Note: Flags indicate national team as has been defined under FIFA eligibility rules. Players may hold more than one non-FIFA nationality.

League table

Results
Each team played home-and-away against every other team in the league twice, for a total of 36 matches each.

Matches 1–18

Matches 19–36

Positions by round
The table lists the positions of teams after each week of matches. In order to preserve chronological evolvements, any postponed matches are not included to the round at which they were originally scheduled, but added to the full round they were played immediately afterwards.

Relegation play-offs

Semi-final

Final

Season statistics

Top scorers

See also
2017–18 Macedonian Football Cup
2017–18 Macedonian Second Football League
2017–18 Macedonian Third Football League

References

External links
Football Federation of Macedonia 
MacedonianFootball.com 

Macedonia
1
2017-18